FOS or Fos may refer to:

Arts and entertainment 
 Fos (EP), by Elena Paparizou
 Fortress of Solitude, fictional base of Superman

Food 
 French onion soup, a dish
 Fructooligosaccharide, a sweetener

Government, law and military 
 Financial Ombudsman Service, in the United Kingdom
 Financial Ombudsman Service (Australia)
 Forward Operating Site, in the U.S. military
 Freedom of speech, a human right
 Future Office System, Scottish prosecutors' case system

People 
 Fos Williams (1922–2001), Australian-rules footballer
 Peter J. Fos (born 1949), American academic administrator

Places 
 Fos, Haute-Garonne, France
 Fos, Hérault, France
 Fos-sur-Mer, Bouches-du-Rhône, France
 Marseille-Fos Port, France
 Forrest Airport, Western Australian refuelling airfield

Science and technology 
 Fabric OS, in networking
 Factor of safety, in engineering
 Feature-oriented scanning, in microscopy
 Faint Object Spectrograph, on the Hubble Space Telescope
 Fields of Science and Technology, a classification for academic statistics
 Flowers of sulfur
 Flowers of sulfur tests

Molecular biology 
FOS-family transcription factors:
 c-Fos, an oncogene
 FosB, an oncogene
 ΔFosB, a truncated splice variant of FosB
 FOSL1, Fos-related antigen 1
 FOSL2, Fos-related antigen 2

Other uses 
 Florida Ornithological Society, United States
 FOS Open Scouting, a Belgian youth organisation
 Goodwood Festival of Speed, an English hill-climbing event